São José Esporte Clube, commonly known as just São José, is a Brazilian women's football club, based in the city of São José dos Campos, São Paulo state, Brazil. They won the Copa Libertadores Femenina three times and the Copa do Brasil twice.

History
The club is a part of São José Esporte Clube, and its first participation in a professional competition was in the 2010 Campeonato Paulista, when they finished in the second position, after being defeated by Santos in the final. São José competed in the Copa do Brasil in 2011, reaching the Quarterfinals of the competition, when they were eliminated by Rio Preto. In the same year, on November 27, they won the 2011 Copa Libertadores, after beating Chilean club Colo-Colo 1-0 at Estádio Martins Pereira, São José dos Campos. The winning goal was scored by Poliana. The club won the Copa do Brasil in 2012, after beating fellow São Paulo state club Centro Olímpico 1-0 and 4-2 in the final. São José won the Campeonato Paulista for the first time in 2012, after beating Centro Olímpico in the final. They won the Copa do Brasil and the Copa Libertadores again in 2013.

Stadium

São José play their home games at Estádio Martins Pereira. The stadium has a maximum capacity of 15,317 people.

Current squad

Achievements
 International Women's Club Championship
 Winners (1): 2014
 Copa Libertadores Femenina
 Winners (3): 2011, 2013, 2014
Campeonato Brasileiro de Futebol Feminino
 Runners-up (2): 2013, 2015
 Copa do Brasil
 Winners (2): 2012, 2013
 Campeonato Paulista:
 Winners (3): 2012, 2014, 2015
 Runners-up (1): 2010

See also
 Men's team

References

Association football clubs established in 2010
Women's football clubs in Brazil
São José Esporte Clube
2010 establishments in Brazil